The mayor of Ulcinj, officially Mayor of the Ulcinj Municipality, is head of the executive branch of the government of Ulcinj Municipality. The current officeholder is Omer Bajraktari of the United Reform Action who was elected by Municipal Assembly on 3 June 2021, following the 2022 local elections.

List of Mayors of Ulcinj (1990–present) 
 Parties

References 

Lists of mayors
Mayors